Ricardo DaSilva II, better known by his stage name Swingfly, is an American–Swedish naturalised rapper and singer. He is also known by other aliases like Swing-Fly, Richie Pasta and Swing. He started lending his vocal talents to other artists' records, but has also developed also a solo career. He also appeared in Melodifestivalen 2011 with "Me and My Drum", finishing fifth. It became his most successful single, reaching the No. 2 position on the Swedish Singles Chart.

Early career 
Ricardo DaSilva II was born in New York. He lived in Trinidad and Tobago and Panama before relocating to Stockholm, Sweden in 1991. In Stockholm, he became involved in the emerging hip hop scene and joined the Timebomb collective, together with producer Christian Falk, rapper ADL, and DJ Sleepy among others. Three singles were released, including Swingfly's "Smoke 'em Swing", a jazzy number produced by Christian Falk. A series of albums was planned but the record label bailed out.
  
Under the name "Swing", he teamed up with Dr. Alban in 1995 and recorded the Euro-disco hit "Sweet Dreams", featuring Dr. Alban (a cover of the classic Eurythmics song), which peaked at No. 12 in Sweden. This took him into the pop charts in a number of European countries, including the Netherlands, where the single peaked at No. 44.

In 1996, Swingfly appeared on several tracks of ADL's "Absent Minded" project. Due to a small hit via a Hugo Boss commercial, "Absent Minded" hit the road supporting the Fugees European tour in 1996. Swingfly was featured on several tracks on all three albums with soul-jazz collective
Blacknuss All-Stars (later known as Blacknuss), as well as being a frequent contributor to their live shows around Europe and the UK.

He achieved his biggest success through a collaboration with the electro/dub/punk trio Teddybears on their 2004 single "Hey Boy". This song became one of the most played tracks on Swedish radio that summer. The song was listed for 21 weeks on the Sweden Singles Top 60 and peaked at #13. Swingfly has since toured Sweden, Europe and the US with Teddybears and their spin-off project Teddybears STHLM Soundsystem.

Solo career

Swingfly landed a record deal with the largely rock oriented label Dolores Recordings. The label had been responsible for launching the international careers of several Swedish-based artists, such as Caesars, The Soundtrack of Our Lives and I'm From Barcelona. Through Dolores, he released a few singles, and an album was planned for 2006 but was stalled. The singles he released had relative success in the Scandinavian charts. A reworked version of the album was planned to be released in 2008 featuring production from RamPac, Klas Åhlund of Teddybears fame, Kleerup, Rampac and Thomas Rusiak with a rock and punk flavour and electronica influences. This was shelved after his arrest on drug charges. The album God bless the IRS finally came out on 29 April 2009.

Melodifestivalen 2011
He participated in Melodifestivalen 2011 with the song "Me and My Drum". The song prominently featured the vocals of Christoffer Hiding but without crediting him specifically in the competition credits. Swingfly placed second in the first semi-final, and advanced to the final, where he placed fifth overall.

Despite failing to win, the song gained great popularity and was released as a single reaching #2 on Sverigetopplistan, the official Swedish Singles Chart.

Melodifestivalen 2016
Swingfly participated in Melodifestivalen 2016 with the song "You Carved Your name" featuring Helena Gutarra. The song written by Joakim Åhlund and Andreas Kleerup was performed on the third semi-final held on 20 February 2016 in Norrköping, but failed to qualify to the finals.

In popular culture
Swingfly has contributed rap vocals on many artists' songs, including Dr. Alban, Taro, Blacknuss, Robyn, Freddie Cruger, Absent Minded, Looptroop, Ken, Lutricia McNeal and Teddybears.
The track "Singing That Melody" came out in the summer of 2008. One year before its European release, Korean artist Tony An recorded a Korean language cover of the song. This has led to a confusion as to whose version is the original. "Singing That Melody" was written by Ramstrom/Magnusson/Swingfly/Beal.
His songs have been featured in episodes of Private Practice and One Tree Hill; telecasts from NASCAR, Fox Sports, ESPN, and NFL; and the video game FIFA Street 2.
His songs have been used in ads for T.G.I. Friday's, Captain Morgan and Cingular Wireless, and in Tic Tac’s East European commercials.

Discography

Albums

Singles

As lead artist

As featured artist

References

External links
 Swingfly Myspace site
 Swingfly on EMI site
Swingfly list of songs at Discogs.com
Swingfly on LastFM

Rappers from New York City
African-American male rappers
Swedish rappers
Swedish hip hop musicians
Swedish people of African-American descent
Living people
Year of birth missing (living people)
American emigrants to Sweden
English-language singers from Sweden
21st-century African-American people
Melodifestivalen contestants of 2016
Melodifestivalen contestants of 2011